Patrick McDonagh (born 5 November 1906) was a Scottish professional footballer who played as an inside forward. A native of Partick, Glasgow, he started his career in junior football with St Anthony's before moving to England to join Football League Second Division side Barnsley in August 1926. After being restricted to reserve team football for the entirety of the 1926–27 campaign, McDonagh made his professional debut on 24 September 1927, scoring two goals in a 4–2 win at home to Clapton Orient. He made a further eight appearances for the team, before being dropped in early December and despite the sales of fellow forwards Eric Brook and Fred Tilson to Manchester City, McDonagh could not regain his place in the side.

McDonagh subsequently moved to Football League Third Division North outfit Nelson in the summer of 1928 and played his first game for the club in the 1–5 defeat away at Southport on 8 September 1928. During the opening months of the season, he was in competition with fellow Scot Buchanan Sharp for the inside-right position, and never managed to cement a place in the team. McDonagh made his final Nelson appearance on 13 October 1928, in the 3–4 loss to Barrow. In December 1928, he left Nelson and joined Welsh club Bangor City. Some time later, he returned to Scotland with Clydebank, before joining Beith in July 1933. After a year at Beith, he moved to Brechin City. In the summer of 1935, McDonagh had a trial with Workington but was not offered a contract and subsequently had a spell in Ireland with Sligo Rovers. In December 1935, he left Sligo and retired from football.

References

1906 births
Year of death missing
Scottish footballers
Footballers from Glasgow
Association football forwards
Barnsley F.C. players
Nelson F.C. players
Bangor City F.C. players
Clydebank F.C. (1914) players
Beith F.C. players
Brechin City F.C. players
Sligo Rovers F.C. players
English Football League players
St Anthony's F.C. players
Scottish Junior Football Association players
Scottish expatriate footballers
Scottish expatriate sportspeople in Ireland
Expatriate association footballers in the Republic of Ireland
Scottish Football League players